Capitol Offense may refer to:

Capitol Offense (band), an American rock band featuring the politician Mike Huckabee
"Capitol Offense" (Murder, She Wrote), a 1985 television episode
"Capitol Offense" (NCIS), a 2008 television episode
"Capitol Offense!" (Teamo Supremo), a 2002 television episode
Capitol Offense, a 2009 Ben Kincaid novel by William Bernhardt
Capitol Offense, a 2012 novel by Cheryl Bolen
Capitol Offense, a 2007 Nik Kane Alaska Mystery novel by Mike Doogan
Capitol Offense, an annual 24 Hours of LeMons endurance racing event 2010–2012

See also
Capital punishment, punishment for a capital offense